Mihai Vlad Silvășan (born 20 January 1985) is a Romanian basketball coach, and former professional player. He is currently the manager of U BT Cluj-Napoca of the Liga Națională, the top tier of Romanian basketball. He has previously represented Romania's national basketball team at the 2015 Eurobasket qualification, where he was the team's best 3 point shooter.

References

External links
 Eurobasket.com Profile
 FIBA.com profile
 Mihai Silvasan - 3 Point Specialist - Youtube.com Video

1985 births
Living people
Romanian men's basketball players
Sportspeople from Cluj-Napoca
Small forwards
Power forwards (basketball)